The Autobiography of Parley Parker Pratt is the 1874 posthumous autobiography of Latter Day Saint apostle Parley P. Pratt. It was compiled from Pratt's writings by Pratt's son, Parley P. Pratt Jr., with assistance from his wife and apostle John Taylor.

The Autobiography is the most frequently read of Pratt's several works, and it has been suggested that "excluding Lucy Mack Smith's Biographical Sketches ..., it is possibly the most important [Latter Day Saint] historical work written in the nineteenth century". The same author states that due to its accessible prose, it "remains one of the most frequently read texts for Latter-day Saints even in the twenty-first century".

Notes

References
Cheryl L. Bruno, "The Conjugal Relationships of Parley P. Pratt as Portrayed in His 'Autobiography'", Journal of Mormon History, vol. 37, no. 1 (Winter 2011):187–94.
Matthew J. Grow, "A 'Truly Eventful Life': Writing the 'Autobiography' of Parley P. Pratt", Journal of Mormon History, vol. 37, no. 1 (Winter 2011):153–58.
David W. Grua, "Persecution, Memory, and Mormon Identity in Parley Pratt's 'Autobiography'", Journal of Mormon History, vol. 37, no. 1 (Winter 2011):168–73.
Benjamin E. Park, "Parley Pratt's 'Autobiography' as Personal Restoration and Redemption", Journal of Mormon History, vol. 37, no. 1 (Winter 2011):158–64.
Joseph M. Spencer, " On the Poetics of Self-Knowledge: Poetry in Parley Pratt's 'Autobiography'", Journal of Mormon History, vol. 37, no. 1 (Winter 2011):173–78.

External links
 The Autobiography of Parley Parker Pratt (1874) (scans from Brigham Young University library)

1874 books
American autobiographies
Works by Parley P. Pratt
Religious autobiographies
Works by apostles (LDS Church)